Sanger is a city in Fresno County, California, United States. The population was 26,617 at the 2020 census, up from 24,270 at the 2010 census and 18,731 at the 2000 census.

Eponym
Sanger is named for Joseph Sanger Jr., an official of the Pacific Improvement Company, which was an affiliate of the Southern Pacific Railroad.

Geography

History
In 1886, the Southern Pacific Company referred to the area as Sanger Junction, concerning plans to improve access to the fertile land. Later the area was known simply as Sanger. The name commemorates Joseph Sanger Jr., secretary-treasurer of the Railroad Yardmasters Association, who visited California in 1887.

In 1888, the Pacific Improvement Company owned and sold lots on the site and the first post office opened.

In 1890, the Kings River Lumber Company built a 62-mile long log flume to transport timber from the High Sierras to Sanger. That year more than 75 buildings were erected.

The Sanger Railroad Depot was built in 1887 next to the Southern Pacific Railroad line that connected Fresno to Porterville.  It is a Southern Pacific standard design Two Story Combination Depot No. 13 or 19. Sanger became a center for shipping grain, citrus and lumber from the nearby mountains.  When the depot was retired, it was the oldest building in the city and was donated to the Sanger Historical Society which turned it into the Sanger Depot Museum in 1977.

By 1908, Sanger had a grammar school, a high school, seven churches, two newspapers, an opera house, a bank, grain warehouses, packing houses and two physicians.

The city incorporated in 1911.

In 1949, the city was designated the "Nation's Christmas Tree City" by the U.S. Postal Service.

Demographics

2010
At the 2010 census Sanger had a population of 24,270. The racial makeup of Sanger was 14,454 (59.6%) White, 219 (0.9%) African American, 311 (1.3%) Native American, 758 (3.1%) Asian, 39 (0.2%) Pacific Islander, 7,645 (31.5%) from other races, and 844 (3.5%) from two or more races. Hispanic or Latino of any race were 19,537 persons (80.5%).

The census reported that 24,136 people (99.4% of the population) lived in households, 46 (0.2%) lived in non-institutionalized group quarters, and 88 (0.4%) were institutionalized.

There were 6,659 households, 3,667 (55.1%) had children under the age of 18 living in them, 3,736 (56.1%) were opposite-sex married couples living together, 1,276 (19.2%) had a female householder with no husband present, 565 (8.5%) had a male householder with no wife present.  There were 526 (7.9%) unmarried opposite-sex partnerships, and 49 (0.7%) same-sex married couples or partnerships. 894 households (13.4%) were one person and 459 (6.9%) had someone living alone who was 65 or older. The average household size was 3.62.  There were 5,577 families (83.8% of households); the average family size was 3.90.

The age distribution was 8,164 people (33.6%) under the age of 18, 2,559 people (10.5%) aged 18 to 24, 6,685 people (27.5%) aged 25 to 44, 4,575 people (18.9%) aged 45 to 64, and 2,287 people (9.4%) who were 65 or older.  The median age was 29.2 years. For every 100 females, there were 97.4 males.  For every 100 females age 18 and over, there were 95.6 males.

There were 7,104 housing units at an average density of ,of which 6,659 were occupied, 3,873 (58.2%) by the owners and 2,786 (41.8%) by renters.  The homeowner vacancy rate was 3.1%; the rental vacancy rate was 5.3%.  13,826 people (57.0% of the population) lived in owner-occupied housing units and 10,310 people (42.5%) lived in rental housing units.

2000
At the 2000 census there were 18,931 people in 5,220 households, including 4,306 families, in the city. The racial makeup of the city was 49.53% White, 0.42% Black or African American, 1.20% Native American, 1.96% Asian, 0.08% Pacific Islander, 43.16% from other races, and 3.64% from two or more races.  80.92% of the population were Hispanic or Latino of any race.
Of the 5,220 households 47.5% had children under the age of 18 living with them, 57.2% were married couples living together, 17.5% had a female householder with no husband present, and 17.5% were non-families.  14.3% of households were one person and 8.4% were one person aged 65 or older.  The average household size was 3.60 and the average family size was 3.91.

The age distribution was 34.1% under the age of 18, 11.6% from 18 to 24, 27.7% from 25 to 44, 16.6% from 45 to 64, and 10.1% 65 or older.  The median age was 28 years.  For every 100 females, there were 100.6 males.  For every 100 females age 18 and over, there were 99.3 males.

The median income for a household in the city was $32,072, and the median family income  was $33,219.  Males had a median income of $26,443 versus $22,808 for females. The per capita income for the city was $11,625.  About 21.0% of families and 23.7% of the population were below the poverty line, including 30.3% of those under age 18 and 15.7% of those age 65 or over.

Arts and culture 
In downtown Sanger is a mural of German-born actress Nastassja Kinski. This was created in 1982 by Sanger native artist Jose Maro Alvarado.

Notable people
 Earl J. Atkisson – World War I Colonel in the US Army
 Tom Flores – Professional football player and coach and Pro Football Hall of Famer, Class of 2021
 Jim Merlo – Professional football linebacker for the New Orleans Saints from 1973 to 1979
 Manuel Neri – artist
Luis Ortiz (born 1995) - baseball pitcher for the San Francisco Giants
 Edward Dean Price – United States federal judge
 Frankie A. Rodriguez – actor
 Francis Rogallo – aeronautical engineer and inventor

Education 
Sanger Union High School services the community.

References

External links

Incorporated cities and towns in California
Cities in Fresno County, California
Populated places established in 1911
1911 establishments in California